Perang Sudarma Wisuta, meaning the war between father and son, is the name given in Javanese chronicles for a 1478 conflict between the rising Demak Sultanate and the waning Majapahit Empire. It marked the defeat of forces loyal to the Majapahit usurper, Bhre Kertabhumi (Prince Kertabhumi), by Girindrawardhana, son of Singhavikramavardhana, and the independence of the Demak Sultanate under Raden Patah. 1478 is used to date the end of the Majapahit Empire.

Background 
The Demak Sultanate was founded by Raden Patah in 1475. According to Babad Tanah Jawi, he was the son of Kertabhumi and a Chinese concubine. In 1468, Kertabhumi usurped Singhavikramavardhana, exiling him to Daha and reigned as Brawijaya V of Majapahit. However, Singhavikramavardhana's son Girindrawardhana consolidated a power base in Daha to retake the throne. He was supported by religious tensions. To keep Majapahit influence and economic interest, Kertabhumi had awarded Muslim merchant trading rights on the north coast of Java, an action which supported the prominence of Demak Sultanate in following decades. The policy increased Majapahit's economy and influence, but weakened Hindu-Buddhism's position as the dominant religion, as Islam began to spread faster and more freely in Java.

Attack on Trowulan 
The conflict came to a head in 1478. In the Pararaton, it states, ".... bhre Kertabhumi ..... bhre prabhu sang mokta ring kadaton i saka sunyanora-yuganing-wong, 1400". In that year, Girindrawardhana's army under general Udara breached Trowulan's defences and killed Bhre Kertabhumi in his palace. Demak sent reinforcements under Sunan Ngudung, who later died in battle and was replaced by Sunan Kudus. Although they managed to repel the invading army, they came too late to save Kertabhumi. In the Trailokyapuri Jiwu and Petak inscriptions, Girindrawardhana claims the defeat of Kertabhumi, and that with it he reunited Majapahit as one kingdom.

After the conflict, Girindrawardhana reigned as Brawijaya VI of Majapahit until he was killed and replaced by Prabu Udara in 1498, but Demak gained independence and was a sovereign state no longer subject to the Majapahit Empire. The conflict led to continued war between Demak and the Majapahit rump in Daha, since Demak rulers claimed descent from Kertabhumi. This only ended with the defeat of Prabu Udara and the fall of Daha in 1527.

Legacy 
Today, 1478 is commemorated as among Javanese today with the candrasengkala  (sirna = 0, ilang = 0, kerta = 4, bumi = 1) (lost and gone is the pride of the land).

Notes

References

Citations

Bibliography
 
 
 
 
 

15th century in Indonesia
Conflicts in 1478
History of Java
Majapahit